The following is a glossary of common English language and scientific terms used in the description of gastropods.

 Abapical – away from the apex of a shell toward the base

 Acephalous – Headless.

 Acinose – Full of small bulgings; resembling the kernel in a nut.

 Aculeate – Very sharply pointed, as the teeth on the radula of some snails.

 Acuminate – gradually tapering to a point, as the spire of some shells.

 Acute – Sharp or pointed, as the spire of a shell, or the lip of a shell.

 Adapical  – toward the apex of a shell (<--> abapical)

 Admedian – Next to the central object, as the lateral teeth on the lingual membrane.

 Adpressed – with overlapping whorls or with a suture tightly pressed to the previous whorl (preferred to the term appressed)

 Afferent – To bring in; when relating to a vessel or duct, indicating that it brings in its contents.

 Amoeboid – Shaped like an amoeba, a small animalcule.

 Amorphous – Without distinct form.

 Amphibious – Inhabiting both land and water.

 Amphidetic – With the ligament on both sides of the umbones.

 Anal canal – Tubular of gutter-like opening in the shell of a gastropod through which excrements are expelled (see also: siphonal canal)

 Analogue – A likeness between two objects when otherwise they are totally different, as the wing of a bird and the wing of a butterfly.

 Anastomosing – Coming together.

 Annular – Made up of rings.

 Anterior – The front or fore end.

 Aquatic – Inhabiting the water.

 Arborescent – Branching like a tree.

 Arched – Bowed or bent in a curve.

 Arcti-spiral – Tightly coiled, as some spiral shells.

 Asphyxiating – Causing suspended animation; apparent death.

 Assimilation – Act of converting one substance into another, as the changing of food-stuffs into living bodies.

 Asymmetrical – Not symmetrical.

 Atrium

 Atrophied – Wasted away.

 Attenuate – Long and slender, as in some shells.

 Auditory – Connected with the hearing.

 Auricled – Eared, or with ear-like appendages.

 Basal – The bottom or lower part.

 Biangulate – With two angles.

 Bicuspid or bicuspidate – Having two cusps.

 Bifid – Having two arms or prongs.

 Bifurcated – Having two branches.

 Bilateral – With two sides.

 Bilobed – With two lobes.

 Blood sinus 

 Bulbous – Swollen.

 Calcareous – Composed of carbonate of lime.

 Callosity – A hardened and raised bunch, as the callus on the columella of some shells.

 Callus – A deposit of shelly matter.

 Campanulate – Formed like a bell.

 Canaliculate – Resembling a canal, as the deep sutures in some shells.

 Cancellated – Formed of cross-bars, as the longitudinal and spiral lines which cross in some shells.

 Cardiac pouch – Containing the heart and placed near the umb'ones of the shell.

 Carinate – Keeled. With keel.

 Cartilaginous – Like cartilage.

 Caudal – Tail-like, or with a tail-like appendage.

 Cellular – Made up of cells.

 Cerebral – Pertaining to the brain.

 Channeled – Grooved or formed like a channel.

 Chitinous – Formed of chitin, as the radulas of gastropods.

 Ciliary – By means of cilia.

 Ciliated – Having cilia.

 Cilium (plural cilia) – A lash; used to designate the hairs on the mantle, gills, etc.

 Clavate – Club-shaped.

 Coarctate – Pressed together, narrowed.

 Concave – Excavated, hollowed out.

 Conchiolin 

 Conic – Shaped like a cone.

 Connective – A part connecting two other parts, as a muscle connecting two parts of the body, or a nerve connecting two ganglia.

 Constricted – Narrowed.

 Contractile – Capable of being contracted or drawn in, as the tentacle of a snail.

 Convex – Bulged out, as the whorls of some snails.

 Convoluted – Rolled together.

 Cordate – Heart-shaped.

 Corneous – Horn-like, as the opercula of some gastropods.

 Corrugated – Roughened by wrinkles.

 Costate – Having rib-like ridges.

 Crenulate – Wrinkled on the edges.

 Crescentic – Like a crescent.

 Cylindrical – Like a cylinder.

 Decollated – Cut off, as the apex of some shells.

 Decussated – With spiral and longitudinal lines intersecting, as the sculpture of some shells.

 Deflexed – Bent downward, as the last whorl in some snails.

 Dentate – With points or nodules resembling teeth, as the aperture of some snails.

 Denticulate – Finely dentate.

 Depressed – Flattened, as the spire in some snails.

 Dextral – Right-handed.

 Digitiform – Finger-like.

 Dilated – Expanded in all directions, as the aperture of a shell.

 Dimorphism – With two forms or conditions.

 Dioecious – Having the sexes in two individuals, one male and one female.

 Distal – The farthest part from an object.

 Discoidal – Shaped like a flat disk.

 Diverticulum – A pouch or hole, as the pouch containing the radula, or that containing the dart in helices.

 Dormant – In a state of torpor or sleep.

 Dorsal – The back. In gastropods the opposite to the aperture.

 Ectocone – The outer cusp on the teeth of the radula.

 Edentulous – Without teeth or folds, as the aperture in some gastropods.

 Efferent – Carrying out.

 Elliptical – With an oval form.

 Elongated – Drawn out, as the spire of a shell.

 Emarginate – Bluntly notched.

 Encysted – Enclosed in a cyst.

 Entocone – The inner cusp on the teeth of the radula.

 Entire – With even, unbroken edges, as the aperture of some shells.

 Epiphallus – A portion of the vas deferens which becomes modified into a tube-like organ and is continued beyond the apex of the penis; it frequently bears a blind duct, or flagellum.

 Epithelium – All tissues bounding a free surface.

 Equidistant – Equally spaced, as the spiral lines on some snail shells.

 Equilibrating – Balancing equally.

 Eroded – Worn away, as the epidermis on some shells.

 Erosive – Capable of erosion.

 Excavated – Hollowed out, as the columella of some snails.

 Excurrent – Referring to the siphon which carries out the waste matter of the body.

 Exoskeleton – The outer skeleton; all shells are exoskeletons.

 Exserted – Brought out.

 Expanded – Spread out, as the lip of some shells.

 Falcate – Scythe-shaped.

 Fasciculus – A little bundle.

 Flagellate – Animals with a flagellum or lash.

 Flexuous – Formed in a series of curves or turnings, as the columella in some shells.

 Flocculent – Clinging together in bunches.

 Fluviatile – Living in running streams.

 Fusiform – Thick in the middle and tapering at each end.

 Gelatinous – Like jelly, as the eggs of some mollusks.

 Gibbous – Very much rounded, as the whorls in some snails.

 Glandular – Like a gland.

 Globose – Rounded.

 Granulated – Covered with little grains.

 Gravid – A female mollusk with ovaries distended with young.

 Gregarious – Living in colonies.

 Gular – Relating to the windpipe or palate. In mollusks, referring to the innermost part of the aperture.

 Habitat – Locality of a species.

 Hasmolymph – Molluscan blood.

 Heliciform – In form like Helix.

 Hemispherical – Half a sphere.

 Herbivorous – Subsisting upon vegetable food.

 Hermaphrodite – Having the sexes united in the same individual.

 Hibernation – The act of hibernating or going to sleep for the winter months.

 Hirsute – Covered with hairs, as some snails.

 Hispid – Same as hirsute.

 Homologous – Having the same position or value, as the wing of a bird and of a bat.

 Hyaline – Glassy.

 Imperforate – Not perforated or umbilicated.

 Impressed – Marked by a furrow, as the impressed spiral lines on some gastropod shells.

 Incrassate – Thickened.

 Incurved – Leaned or bent over, as the apex in some snails.

 Indented – Notched.

 Inflected – Turned in, as the teeth of some snails.

 Inhalent – Same as incurrent.

 Inoperculate – Without an operculum.

 Intercostate – Between the ribs or ridges.

 Invaginate – One part bending into another, as the tentacles of some land snails.

 Invertible – Capable of being inverted, or drawn in, as the eye-peduncles of a land snail.

 Juvenile 

 Keeled – With a more or less sharp projection at the periphery.

 Lamellated – Covered with scales.

 Lamelliform – Having the form of scales.

 Laminated – Consisting of plates or scales laid over each other.

 Lanceolate – Gradually tapering to a point.

 Lateral – Pertaining to the side.

 Latticed – (See decussated.)

 Lobulate – Composed of lobes.

 Longitudinal – The length of a shell.

 Lunate – Shaped like a half moon, as the aperture in some shells.

 Malleated – Appearing as though hammered.

 Manducatory – Relating to the apparatus for masticating food. In snails, the jaws and radula.

 Median – Middle, as the middle tooth on the radula.

 Mesocene – The middle cusp on the teeth of the radula.

 Monoecius – Having the sexes united in the same individual.

 Multifid – Made up of many lobes or projections, as the cusps on some radulae.

 Multispiral – Consisting of many whorls, as some fresh-water snails.

 Nacreous – Pearly or iridescent.

 Nepionic – The second stage of the embryonic shell, as the glochidium.

 Notched – Nicked or indented, as the anterior canal of some gastropods.

 Nucleus – The first part or beginning, as the apex in a gastropod shell.

 Nucleated – Having a nucleus.

 Obconic – In the form of a reversed cone.

 Oblique – Slanting, as the aperture of some shells when not parallel to the longitudinal axis.

 Obovate – Reversed ovate, as some shells when the diameter is greater near the upper than at the lower part.

 Obtuse – Dull or blunt, as the apex of some gastropods.

 Olfactory – Pertaining to the smell.

 Olivaceous – Colored like an olive.

 Organism – An organized being, or living object made up of organs.

 Ovate – Egg-shaped.

 Ovately conic – Shaped like an egg, but with a somewhat conic apex, as some gastropods.

 Oviparous – Bringing forth young in an egg which is hatched after it is laid.

 Ovisac – A pouch in which the eggs or embryos are contained.

 Ovoviviparous – In this case the young are formed in an egg but are hatched inside the parent.

 Pallial lung 

 Papillose – Covered with many little bulgings or pimples.

 Parallel – Having the same relative distance in all parts, as when the spiral lines in univalve shells are the same distance apart all the way around.

 Patelliform – Shaped like a flattened-out cone, as an Ancylus.

 Patulous – Open and spreading, as the aperture in some gastropods.

 Paucispiral – Only slightly spiral, as some opercula.

 Pectinate – Like the teeth of a comb, as the gills of some mollusks.

 Pedal – Pertaining to the foot.

 Pedunculated – Supported on a stem or stalk, as the eyes of land snails.

 Pellucid – Transparent or clear, as the shells of some snails; e. g. Vitrea.

 Penultimate – The whorl before the last in gastropod shells.

 Pericardium – The chamber containing the heart.

 Periostracum – The epidermal covering of some shells.

 Pervious – Very narrowly open, as the umbilicus in some snails.

 Phytophagus – Vegetable-feeding.

 Pilose – Covered with hairs.

 Pinnate – Branched like a feather, as the gills of some mollusks.

 Plaited – Folded.

 Planispiral shell 

 Planorboid – Flat and orb-like, as some snails.

 Pleurae – Relating to the side of a body.

 Plexus – A network of vessels, as the form of the lungs in snails.

 Plicated – Made up of folds.

 Plumose – Resembling plumes.

 Polygonal – Having many angles.

 Porcellanous – Like porcelain.

 Prismatic – Like a prism.

 Prodissoconch – The embryonic shell.

 Protoconch – The embryonic shell.

 Protract – To push out.

 Protractor pedis – The foot protractor muscle.

 Protrusile – Capable of being pushed out.

 Proximal – The nearest end of an object.

 Pulsation – A throb, as the throbbing of the heart.

 Pupiform – Like a pupa; one of the stages in the development of an insect.

 Pustulate – Covered with pustules or little pimples.

 Pustulose – Same as pustulate.

 Pyramidal – Having the form of a pyramid.

 Pyriform – Shaped like a pear.

 Reflected – Bent backward, as the lip in some snails.

 Reflexed – Same as Reflected.

 Renal – Relating to the kidneys.

 Reticulated – Resembling a network, as when the longitudinal and spiral lines cross in a snail.

 Retractile – Capable of being drawn in, as the eye peduncles in land snails.

 Retractor pedis – Foot retractor muscle.

 Revolving lines – Spiral lines on a snail shell which run parallel with the sutures.

 Rhombic – Having four sides, the angles being oblique.

 Rhomboid – Four-sided, but two of the sides being longer than the others.

 Rimate – Provided with a very small hole or crack, as some snails in which the umbilicus is very narrowly open.

 Roundly lunate – Rounder than lunate (which see).

 Rostriform – In the form of a rostrum.

 Rudimentary – Not fully formed; imperfect.

 Rugose – Rough or wrinkled, as parts of some shells.

 Sacculated – Somewhat like a sac, or composed of sac-like parts.

 Scalar – Resembling a ladder.

 Secreted – Produced or deposited from the blood or glands, as the shell material in mollusks.

 Semicircular – Half round or circular, as the aperture in some snails.

 Semidentate – Half toothed, as the parietal wall in some land snails.

 Semielliptic – Half elliptical.

 Semiglobose – Half, or not quite globose.

 Semilunate – Half lunate.

 Semioval – Half, or not quite oval.

 Serrated – Notched, like the teeth on a saw.

 Serriform – In the form of series.

 Sessile – Attached without a stem, as the eyes in some water snails.

 Shouldered – Ridged, as the whorls in some snails.

 Sigmoid – Shaped like the letter S.

 Siliceous – Made up of silex.

 Sinistral – Having the aperture on the left side.

 Sinusigerid – with a diagonally cancellate (structure)

 Sinuous – Curved in and out, as the edge of some bivalves and the lips of some snails.

 Siphonal canal – semi-tubular extension of the aperture of the shell through which the siphon is extended when the animal is active

 Spatulate – In the form of a spatula, a flat-bladed instrument used by druggists in pulverizing drugs.

 Spherical – Shaped like a sphere.

 Spiral – Wound about a central cavity, as the whorls of snails.

 Striated – Marked by lines or striae.

 Subangulated – Moderately angled.

 Subcarinated – Moderately carinated.

 Subcentral – Not quite in the center.

 Subcircular – Not quite circular.

 Subconical – Moderately conical.

 Subcylindrical – Moderately cylindrical.

 Subequal – Not quite equal.

 Subexcavated – A little excavated.

 Subfusiform – Moderately fusiform.

 Subglobose – Moderately globose.

 Subglobular – Moderately globular.

 Subhyaline – Moderately glassy.

 Subimperforate – Not much perforated.

 Suboblong – Moderately oblong.

 Subobsolete – Almost disappearing.

 Subovate – Nearly ovate.

 Subparallel – Almost parallel.

 Subperforated – Almost perforated.

 Subquadrate – Almost four-sided.

 Subreflected – Moderately turned back.

 Subrotund – Moderately round.

 Subspiral – Moderately spiral.

 Subtriangulate – Moderately or almost triangular.

 Subtrigonal – Moderately three-angled.

 Subtruncate – Moderately cut off.

 Subumbilicated – Moderately umbilicated.

 Sulcated – Grooved.

 Sulcus – A longitudinal furrow.

 Superanal – Above the anus.

 Supra-peripheral – Above the periphery.

 Symmetrical – Alike on both sides or uniform in all parts.

 Terrestrial – Living on the land.

 Testaceous – Composed of shelly matter.

 Torsion – A twisting around.

 Tortuous – Twisted or winding.

 Torpid – Half unconscious or asleep, as a snail during hibernation.

 Translucent – Not quite transparent; light is seen through the thin edges of the object.

 Transparent – Objects may be seen through the substance.

 Transverse – Referring to the form of a shell when it is wider than high.

 Tricuspidate – Having three cusps.

 Trifid – Having three branches.

 Trigonal – Having three angles.

 Trilobate – Having three lobes.

 Tripartite – Divided into three parts, as the foot of some snails.

 Truncate – Having the end cut off squarely.

 Tuberculate – Covered with tubercles or rounded knobs.

 Turbinate – Having the form of a top.

 Turriculated – Having the form of a tower.

 Turreted – Having the form of a tower.

 Umbilicated – Having an opening in the base of the shell.

 Undulated – Having undulations or waves.

 Univalve – Having the shell composed of a single piece, as a snail.

 Varicose – Swollen or enlarged.

 Vascular – Containing or made up of blood vessels.

 Vermiform – Formed like a worm.

 Ventral – The lower border or side.

 Ventricose – Swollen or inflated on the ventral side.

 Vibratile – Moving from side to side.

 Vitreous – Resembling glass, as some snails.

See also
 outline of gastropods
 Glossary of biology
 Glossary of scientific names
 Glossary of scientific naming

References
This article include public domain text from Baker, The Mollusca of the Chicago area, 1898-1902.

Gastropods
Gastropod terms
Wikipedia glossaries using unordered lists